Louis Figuier (15 February 1819 in Montpellier – 8 November 1894 in 9th arrondissement of Paris)  was a French scientist and writer.  He was the nephew of Pierre-Oscar Figuier and became Professor of chemistry at L'Ecole de pharmacie of Montpellier. Louis Figuier was married to French writer Louise Juliette Bouscaren.

Career

Figuier became Doctor of Medicine (1841), agrégé of pharmacology, chemistry (1844–1853) and physics and gained his PhD in (1850). Figuier was appointed professor at L'Ecole de Pharmacie of Paris after leaving Montpellier. In his research he found himself opposed to Claude Bernard; as a result of this conflict, he abandoned his research to devote himself to popular science. He edited and published a yearbook from 1857 to 1894 – L'Année scientifique et industrielle (or Exposé annuel des travaux) – in which he compiled an inventory of the scientific discoveries of the year (it was continued after his death until 1914). He was the author of numerous successful works: Les Grandes inventions anciennes et modernes (1861), Le Savant du foyer (1862), La Terre avant le déluge (1863) illustrated by Édouard Riou, La Terre et les mers (1864), Les Merveilles de la science (1867–1891).

He wrote extensively on the subject of photography, including it in his study on the marvels of nineteenth-century science, and also writing a self-standing book on the subject.

Influenced by Charles Lyell's Geological Evidences of the Antiquity of Man of 1863, the 1867 second edition of La Terre avant le déluge abandoned the Garden of Eden shown in the first edition, and included dramatic illustrations of savage men and women wearing animal skins and wielding stone axes.

Main works 

 La terre avant le deluge, 1863, 2nd. edition 1867
English translation, World Before the Deluge, 1865
Swedish translation by Carl Hartman, Jorden före syndafloden, 1868, based on the 5th French edition
 The Vegetable World, 1867
 The Ocean World, 1868
 The Insect World, 1868
 Reptiles and Birds, 1869
 Primitive Man, 1871
 The human race, 1872
 La Photographie, 1889
 Les Merveilles De La Science, Ou Description Populaire Des Inventions Modernes, (The wonders of science or a popular description of modern inventions), 1891

Footnotes

References

External links
 
 
 Figuier's Merveilles de la science (6 vols., 1867-1891) - digital facsimiles from Linda Hall Library
A selection of high-resolution scans from Figuier's L'homme primitif, Primitive man, and Terre avant deluge - from Linda Hall Library

1819 births
1894 deaths
Burials at Père Lachaise Cemetery
French male non-fiction writers
French medical writers